Despicable Me: Original Motion Picture Soundtrack is the soundtrack to the film of the same name, and it was released on July 6, 2010. It features new songs from the film written, performed, produced and/or composed by Pharrell Williams, and performances by Destinee & Paris, The Sylvers, Robin Thicke, The Bee Gees, and David Bisbal. A soundtrack album including the many other songs that appear in the film has not been officially released.

The film's score was composed by Pharrell Williams & Heitor Pereira and produced by Hans Zimmer. It was recorded with a 67-piece ensemble of the Hollywood Studio Symphony at the Newman Scoring Stage at 20th Century Fox. As of December 30, 2010, the film's score had not been officially released; however, 8 tracks appeared on MagicBoxMusic.com in November 2010.

Two of the songs that appeared in the film, "Despicable Me" and "Prettiest Girls", appeared on the Best Original Song shortlist for the 83rd Academy Awards.

Despicable Me: Original Motion Picture Soundtrack

Despicable Me: Original Motion Picture Soundtrack (More Music)

Despicable Me Score

Despicable Me Score (Promo)

Despicable Me Score (EP)

References

External links
 Soundtracks for Despicable Me at Internet Movie Database

Despicable Me
Pharrell Williams albums
2010 soundtrack albums
Albums produced by Pharrell Williams
Comedy film soundtracks
Interscope Records soundtracks
Star Trak Entertainment albums